The 1994 ATP Championship Series, Single Week was a series of tennis tournaments that was part of the 1994 ATP Tour, the elite tour for professional men's tennis organised by the Association of Tennis Professionals. It formed the tier below the Grand Slam tournaments.

Results

Tournament details

Indian Wells

Singles

Doubles

Key Biscayne

Singles

Doubles

Monte Carlo

Singles

Doubles

Hamburg

Singles

Doubles

Rome

Singles

Doubles

Toronto

Singles

Doubles

Cincinnati

Singles

Doubles

Stockholm

Singles

Doubles

Paris

Singles

Doubles

Titles won by player

Singles

See also 
 ATP Tour Masters 1000
 1994 ATP Tour
 1994 WTA Tier I Series
 1994 WTA Tour

References

External links 
 Association of Tennis Professionals (ATP) official website

Atp Super 9, 1994
ATP Tour Masters 1000